Alexander Antonio Oroz Huerta (born 15 December 2002) is a Chilean footballer who plays as a winger for Colo-Colo.

Club career
A product of Colo-Colo youth system, he was loaned to Deportes Iquique in the Primera B for the 2021 season, where he made his professional debut scoring a goal in the first matchday versus Coquimbo Unido on 4 April 2021. In total, he made 28 appearances and scored 5 goals for Deportes Iquique before returning Colo-Colo for the 2022 season. He made his debut playing for Colo-Colo scoring a goal in the match versus Everton on 6 February 2022.

International career
In 2017, Oroz took part of Chile U15 squad with Cristian Leiva as the coach. At under-17 level, he represented Chile at both the 2019 South American Championship – Chile was the runner-up – and the 2019 FIFA World Cup. Previously, in October 2018 he took part in the Torneo Cuatro Naciones Sub-17 (2018 Four Nations Tournament) in Mexico, making 3 appearances and scoring a goal versus Mexico U17.

At senior level, he was called up to the FIFA matchdays in June 2022 as a "projectable player" in the preliminary squad.

Personal life
Oroz is the nephew of the former Chile Olympic footballer Andrés Oroz. In addition, his father, Antonio, was with the Colo-Colo youth ranks and plays football at amateur level as a left midfielder.

He has been nicknamed La Flecha (The Arrow) by his coach in Chile U15, Cristian Leiva, because of his speed.

Honours
Colo-Colo
 Supercopa de Chile (1): 2022

References

External links

Alexander Oroz at PlaymakerStats

2002 births
Footballers from Santiago
Living people
Chilean footballers
Chile youth international footballers
Colo-Colo footballers
Deportes Iquique footballers
Chilean Primera División players
Primera B de Chile players
Association football defenders